Artworks by Pablo Picasso from 1931 to 1940:

 Still Life on Pedestal Table – 1931
 The Sculptor - 1931 
 Figures by the Sea – 1931
 Woman with Yellow Hair – 1931
 Woman in a Red Armchair (1931), displayed in public for the first time in 2016 at the Met Breuer; not to be confused with Woman in a Red Armchair (1929)
 Bust of a Woman (Marie-Thérèse) (1931)
 Girl before a Mirror – 1932
Young Woman with Mandolin – 1932, likely a portrait of Picasso's young mistress Marie-Thérèse Walter, University of Michigan Museum of Art
 Woman with Book – 1932
 La Lecture – 1932
Le Repos - 1932
 Le Rêve – 1932
 Nude, Green Leaves and Bust – 1932
Nude in a Black Armchair - 1932
 Nude Woman in a Red Armchair (Marie-Thérèse Walter, 1932), Tate
 The Red Armchair – 1933
 The Rooster – 1933
 Woman with a Vase – 1933
 Seated Model & Sculptor Studying Sculptured Head (1933) from the Vollard Suite
 Minotaur Kneeling over Sleeping Girl – 1933
 The Bullfight (Courses de taureaux) – 1934, oil on canvas, University of Michigan Museum of Art
 Dying Bull – 1934
 Girl Reading at a Table – 1934
 The Painter  - 1934, Wadsworth Atheneum
 The Studio – 1934 (oil and enamel on canvas, 5' 1/3" x 4' 1/4", collection of the Metropolitan Museum of Art)
Two Girls Reading (Deux Enfants Lisant) – 1934, oil on canvas, University of Michigan Museum of Art
Jeune Fille Endormie – 1935
 The Muse – 1935
 Minotauromachy – 1935
 Minotaur Moving – 1936
 Faun Revealing a Sleeping Woman (Jupiter and Antiope, after Rembrandt) (1936), Tate
 The Vollard Suite of 100 etchings was completed in 1937. Commissioned in 1930, Picasso had begun work on the suite in 1933. Over 300 sets were created.
 Seated Woman (Portrait of Marie-Thérèse Walter) – 1937
 Lee Miller (of Lee Miller, 1937)
 The Dream and Lie of Franco – 1937
 Guernica – 1937
Portrait of Dora Maar - 1937
 The Weeping Woman (1937), Tate Modern
 The Bathers – 1937
 Woman in Hat and Fur Collar – 1937
 Girl with a Red Beret and Pompom – 1937
 Femme au béret et à la robe quadrillée (Marie-Thérèse Walter) - 1937
 The Artist Before His Canvas – 1938
 Girl With A Boat – 1938
 Man with a Lollipop −1938
 Woman with a Hairnet – 1938
 Maya in a Sailor Suit – 1938
 Maya with Doll – 1938 (owned by Diana Widmaier Picasso)
 Dora Maar Seated (1938), Tate
 Woman with Cockerel -1938
 Una mujer -1939
 Woman's Head – 1939

Sources

1931-1940
Picasso 1931-1940
1930s in art